Ben Wyvis distillery was a producer of single malt Scotch whisky that operated between 1965 and 1977.

History
The first distillery to use the name "Ben Wyvis" operated between 1879 and 1926 in Dingwall (just south along what is now the A862 road). It was founded by D. G. Ross, but was then sold to Scotch Whisky Distillers in 1887. When Scotch Whisky Distillers was liquidated, the Ben Wyvis distillery was sold to the Ferintosh Distillery Co. Ltd., which was owned by Kirker, Greer & Co. in Belfast. The name was then changed to "Ferintosh". As of 2010, no whisky from this distillery  is known to exist. A residential development on the original site is "Wyvis House".

The Ben Wyvis distillery that began operation in 1965 was started by the Invergordon distillery, and was built on the Invergordon grain distillery complex. It was intended primarily to produce whisky for use in Invergordon blends, but did produce a very small number of single malts. When Ben Wyvis was demolished in 1977, the stills were saved and eventually used by the Glengyle distillery.

Single malts
Legitimate single malt bottlings from the distillery's 1965-1977 operation are exceptionally rare. Years after the distillery had closed, Invergordon offered a single malt under the "Ben Wyvis" name, but for a retail price approximately £20. This led to at least one incident where such a bottle was placed in an auction with estimates meant to imply that it was an original Ben Wyvis single malt: on 28 March 2007, McTear's Auctioneers offered Lot 166 (a 10-year-old Ben Wyvis) with an estimated value of £400-£600, and the auction closed with a sale price of £360. After significant public-relations pressure developed over the possible misrepresentation of the whisky, McTear's offered to cancel the sale.

References

External links
Malt Madness 
Scotch Whisky

1965 establishments in Scotland
1977 disestablishments in Scotland
Scottish malt whisky
Distilleries in Scotland
Invergordon
British companies disestablished in 1977
British companies established in 1965